In baseball, the lefty-righty switch is a maneuver by which a player that struggles against left-handed or right-handed players is replaced by a player who excels in the situation, usually only for the duration of the situation in question. For instance, a right-handed pitcher who is weak against left-handed hitting and is facing a left-handed hitter would be replaced with a pitcher, usually left-handed, who does a superior job of getting a left-handed hitter out. Similarly, a batter who has difficulty hitting against a left-handed pitcher will sometimes be pinch hit for by a batter who does well, even if the original player is superior in other respects.

Conventional baseball wisdom suggests that, when a pitcher and a hitter pitch or bat with the same hand, the pitcher typically has the advantage. This especially holds true for left-handed pitchers, as lefties are less common in a major-league lineup than righties. As a result, the most common use of the lefty-righty switch is when a right-handed pitcher is facing a left-handed batter. The manager of the defensive team will sometimes go to the bullpen, especially in close games where a reliever has already entered the game, and pull out a left-handed specialist to face the left-handed batter. The new pitcher will then attempt to get the batter out. Whether he succeeded or failed, a left-handed specialist was often replaced after an at bat until the introduction of the three-batter rule.

The lefty-righty switch can also be used against switch hitters who are noticeably poorer from one side of the plate than the other, or in the somewhat rarer instance of a batter who does poorly against opposite-handed pitchers. The basic principle in these cases remains the same.

It is less common, although still frequent, for a batter to be replaced to gain a handedness advantage over a pitcher. For instance, with a left-handed pitcher in and a left-handed batter due up, a right-handed bat may be called in from the bench. The righty may not be as strong an all-round player as the player he replaced (thus, his absence from the everyday lineup), but he is a superior tactical choice for the purpose of getting on base in one at bat with a favorable matchup. Such a batter can be pinch run for if he gets on, replaced with a better defensive player for the next half-inning, or simply left in for the duration of the game.

The two maneuvers sometimes occur in sequence. For instance, a manager may be faced with the situation of a right-handed reliever facing a strong left-handed bat late in a close game. In such a situation, the manager will often call for his left-handed specialist. However, if the opposing manager has an adequate right-handed bat on his bench, he may pinch hit for the left-handed batter, thus restoring his matchup advantage. As of 2020, the rules of baseball dictate that a pitcher usually must face at least three batters once he has entered a game, therefore the defensive manager will find himself in the unpleasant situation of having his left-handed specialist (who likely seldom sees right-handers in game action and may struggle badly against them) against a right-handed hitter. The defensive manager, however, may consider this an acceptable tradeoff versus facing the original left-handed batter with his right-handed pitcher.

Starting pitchers, and sometimes long relievers, will often face batters who hit from both sides of the plate as a matter of course. This is considered a part of their job, and the ability to retire batters from either side of the plate is an important asset for any starting pitcher. Most starters, especially those who rely on ball movement rather than power, are still stronger throwing against one side of the plate, however, the difference is often less pronounced than that for pitchers in the bullpen. Late in close games, when the starter is tiring and baserunners become more important, a starter may be lifted for a specialist, but a starting pitcher is very seldom replaced with a specialist without having first worked deep into a close ballgame.

Similarly, position players must accept facing both left-handed and right-handed pitching as part of their job. Managers will usually juggle batters who are exceptionally weak against one sort of pitcher so that they only face starting pitchers who offer favorable matchups, but it is impossible to shield a batter from every instance in which he will face a pitcher who has him at a disadvantage. As a result, a position player must be prepared at all times to face a lefty-righty switch in a situation where his team cannot afford to pinch hit for him.

This tactical maneuvering has led to the statistical oddity of a pitcher pitching in a game without throwing a single pitch. On June 29, 2018, the Cleveland Indians visited the Oakland Athletics. In the bottom of the seventh inning with two outs and two runners on base, the A's were leading 2-0 with left-handed hitters Dustin Fowler and Matt Joyce coming up. Indians manager Terry Francona replaced his right-handed starter Trevor Bauer with left-handed specialist Oliver Perez. The A's countered by pinch-hitting Mark Canha for Fowler, whom Perez intentionally walked by holding out four fingers to the home plate umpire (a newly implemented option for the 2018 season). But this loaded the bases for Chad Pinder, who pinch-hit for Joyce. Francona did not want Perez to face a righty and had no base to put the batter onto, so he removed Perez in favor of right-handed reliever Zach McAllister. Perez was therefore credited with zero innings pitched, one batter faced, one intentional walk, and zero pitches thrown.

See also
 Platoon system

References

Baseball terminology
Baseball strategy
Handedness in baseball